SARAF is a protein that in humans is encoded by the SARAF gene, formerly known as TMEM66 (transmembrane protein 66).

Function  

SARAF (TMEM66) is a negative regulator of the store-operated calcium channel (SOCE) into cells. SARAF is an endoplasmic reticulum (ER) membrane resident protein that associates with STIM1, to facilitate the inactivation of SOCE. SARAF plays a key role in shaping cytoplasmic calcium signals and determining the content of the major intracellular Ca2+ stores in the cell. By doing so it is likely to be important in protecting cells from calcium overfilling.

References

Further reading